Lukáš Hartig (born 28 October 1976) is a Czech former professional footballer who played as a striker. 

He stands 185 cm tall and weighs 76 kg. He played for Zenit St. Petersburg since 2003 and transferred to Artmedia in August 2005. In 2006, he transferred to Olomouc.

References

External links
 
 

1976 births
Living people
Czech footballers
Czech First League players
Bohemians 1905 players
AC Sparta Prague players
SK Sigma Olomouc players
FC Zenit Saint Petersburg players
FC Petržalka players
ŠK Slovan Bratislava players
Slovak Super Liga players
Czech expatriate footballers
Expatriate footballers in Slovakia
Expatriate footballers in Russia
Russian Premier League players
Czech expatriate sportspeople in Slovakia
Czech expatriate sportspeople in Russia

Association football forwards